The 2018–19 Little Rock Trojans men's basketball team represented the University of Arkansas at Little Rock during the 2018–19 NCAA Division I men's basketball season. The Trojans, led by first-year head coach Darrell Walker, played their home games at the Jack Stephens Center in Little Rock, Arkansas as members of the Sun Belt Conference. They finished the season 10–21, 5–13 in Sun Belt play to finish in a tie for last place. They failed to qualify for the Sun Belt tournament.

Previous season
The Trojans finished the 2017–18 season 7–25, 4–14 in Sun Belt play to finish in last place. They lost in the first round of the Sun Belt tournament to Appalachian State.

On March 9, 2018, the school fired head coach Wes Flanigan after just two seasons where he compiled a record of 22–42. On March 29, the school hired former NBA player Darrell Walker who had spent the last two seasons as head coach of Division II Clark Atlanta University.

Roster

Schedule and results

 
|-
!colspan=9 style=| Non-conference regular season

|-
!colspan=9 style=| Sun Belt Conference regular season

References

Little Rock
Little Rock Trojans men's basketball seasons
Little Rock
Little Rock